Terry Tolkin (September 10, 1959 – January 21, 2022) was an American music executive and music journalist.

In the 1980s, Tolkin worked for several record labels, including Touch & Go Records, Rough Trade Records, and his own No.6 Records. From 1992 to 1996, he was an A&R representative for Elektra Records, where he signed alternative groups such as Stereolab and Afghan Whigs.

Early career
Tolkin originated from Kansas, moving to New York City in his youth.

Tolkin has been credited for coining the term "alternative music" in 1979 while writing for the trade publication Rockpool. Tolkin never disputed that claim, but it is undetermined whether he was the first to use the term. He also worked at the 99 Records store in New York City and as a booker at New York clubs such as Danceteria and CBGBs.

Record industry career
Tolkin worked for several independent and major labels over the course of his career. While working for Touch & Go Records, he signed the Butthole Surfers and the Virgin Prunes. In the late 1980s, Tolkin worked for Rough Trade Records and established his label No.6 Records as a subsidiary. No.6 released music by artists such as Unrest, Tindersticks, and Dean Wareham.

In 1988, Tolkin conceived and produced the alternative rock tribute album The Bridge: A Tribute To Neil Young,"  which featured many new and upcoming bands who would later achieve commercial and critical success, including  Pixies, Sonic Youth, Dinosaur Jr., The Flaming Lips, Soul Asylum, Nick Cave and Psychic TV. Over 80% percent of the profits from The Bridge went directly to The Bridge School, an organization for children suffering from Cerebral Palsy run by Neil Young and his wife Pegi.  Young once said of the project, "I love it! We played it on the tour bus all year long!" while Rolling Stone called The Bridge "one of the best conceived and executed" tribute albums of all time. 

In the late 1980s, Tolkin worked as A&R for Rough Trade Records. 

Tolkin was part of the A&R team at Elektra Records from 1992 to 1996. During his tenure with the label he signed Luna, Stereolab, Afghan Whigs, Scrawl, Vaganza, and others. Wareham wrote the Luna song "Chinatown" from the 1995 album Penthouse about Tolkin.

In April 2009, Teenbeat Records released a compilation of all the No.6 Records 7" singles on a 2-CD set titled "Speed Dating: The No.6 Records Compendium."

In 2015, Dean Wareham reported that Tolkin had an undisclosed illness, which Wareham described as a "Rare and aggressive virus that has his doctors perplexed." That year, Wareham sold an EP of early demos from his band Luna, which Tolkin had signed to Elektra, on Bandcamp to help Tolkin pay medical bills.

Death
Tolkin died on January 21, 2022, at the age of 62 in New Orleans.

References

External links
 

1959 births
2022 deaths
Place of birth missing
American music industry executives
American music journalists
A&R people
Elektra Records